was a  after Ōwa and before Anna. This period spanned the years from July 964 through August 968.

Change of era
 February 16, 964 : The new era name was created to mark an event or series of events. The previous era ended and the new one commenced in Ōwa 4, on the 10th day of the 7th month of 964.

Events of the Kōhō era
 964 (Kōhō 1, 4th month): The Empress Fujiwara no Ansi died. The empress' younger sister married the emperor's older brother, Shigeakira-shinnō; and shortly afterwards, he died and then his wife also died. In his grief, the emperor neglected his duty to care for the government.
 965 (Kōhō 2, 4th month): The udaijin Fujiwara no Akihira died at the age of 68.
 965 (Kōhō 2, 12th month): The emperor celebrated his 40th birthday.
 July 5, 967 (Kōhō 4, 25th of the 5th month): The emperor died at age 42 years, having reigned 21 years in total.

Notes

References
 Brown, Delmer M. and Ichirō Ishida, eds. (1979).  Gukanshō: The Future and the Past. Berkeley: University of California Press. ;  OCLC 251325323
 Nussbaum, Louis-Frédéric and Käthe Roth. (2005).  Japan encyclopedia. Cambridge: Harvard University Press. ;  OCLC 58053128
 Titsingh, Isaac. (1834). Nihon Ōdai Ichiran; ou,  Annales des empereurs du Japon.  Paris: Royal Asiatic Society, Oriental Translation Fund of Great Britain and Ireland. OCLC 5850691
 Varley, H. Paul. (1980). A Chronicle of Gods and Sovereigns: Jinnō Shōtōki of Kitabatake Chikafusa. New York: Columbia University Press. ;  OCLC 6042764

External links
 National Diet Library, "The Japanese Calendar" -- historical overview plus illustrative images from library's collection

Japanese eras